Jonathan Steven Ferguson (born 3 January 1979) is a British firearm historian and author who is currently the Keeper of Firearms and Artillery at the Royal Armouries Museum in Leeds, England. He is also a technical specialist with Armament Research Services, a consultancy firm.

Career 
Ferguson received a Bachelor of Arts degree in archaeology from the University of Exeter in 2000, and a postgraduate diploma in museum studies from the University of Leicester in 2002. He held posts at the Colchester Museum, Imperial War Museum Duxford, and National War Museum of Scotland before joining the Royal Armouries Museum in 2009. He has appeared in two documentaries: Sean Bean on Waterloo (2015) and Sword, Musket & Machine Gun (2017). He was also an interview subject in the mockumentary Cunk on Earth where he was interviewed as an expert on the Colt Single Action Army revolver. Ferguson is also a Technical Specialist with Armament Research Services, a technical intelligence consultancy.

In 2020, GameSpot began a series titled "Firearms Expert Reacts". In the series, Ferguson analyses the firearms from video games such as Escape from Tarkov, Call of Duty: Black Ops Cold War, Insurgency: Sandstorm, and Cyberpunk 2077, and compares them to their real-life counterparts. In 2021, Ferguson began a series on the Royal Armouries' official YouTube channel in which he explains the history and functionality of select firearms from the Armouries.

Select bibliography 
 Thorneycroft to SA80: British Bullpup Firearms, 1901–2020 (Headstamp Publishing, 2020)
 Black & Grey: The Illicit Online Trade of Small Arms in Venezuela (Armament Research Services, 2020)
 An Introductory Guide to the Identification of Small Arms, Light Weapons, and Associated Ammunition (Small Arms Survey, 2018)
 Arms and Armour of the First World War (Royal Armouries, 2018)
 The 'Broomhandle' Mauser (Osprey Publishing, 2017)
 Raising Red Flags: An Examination of Arms & Munitions in the Ongoing Conflict in Ukraine (Armament Research Services, 2014)

References 

 

Gun writers
21st-century British non-fiction writers
Living people
1979 births